A-kinase anchor protein 8-like is a protein that in humans is encoded by the AKAP8L gene.

Interactions 

AKAP8L has been shown to interact with:
 DHX9, and
 Thymopoietin.

References

External links

Further reading 

 
 
 
 
 
 
 
 
 
 
 
 
 

A-kinase-anchoring proteins